Clinton is an unincorporated community in Greene County, Alabama, United States. Clinton has a post office with ZIP code 35448.

References

Unincorporated communities in Greene County, Alabama
Unincorporated communities in Alabama